Kirov is the lead ship of the  of nuclear-powered guided missile cruisers. Originally built for the Soviet Navy and passed onto the succeeding Russian Navy, she and her three sister ships are the largest and heaviest surface combatant warships (i.e. not an aircraft carrier or amphibious assault ship) built by them. The Soviet classification of the ship-type is "heavy nuclear-powered guided missile cruiser", nonetheless Kirovs size and weapons complement have earned her the unofficial designation of a battlecruiser throughout much of the world, as her size and displacement is similar to a typical World War I battleship. She was named after a Project 26 cruiser (named after Sergey Kirov, a Bolshevik hero).

History
She was laid down on 27 March 1974, at the Baltiysky Naval Shipyard in Leningrad, launched on 26 December 1977, and commissioned on 30 December 1980, part of Soviet Northern Fleet. 

When she appeared for the first time in 1981, NATO observers called her BALCOM I (Baltic Combatant I). Her first major deployment was in 1984 where she undertook a voyage to the Mediterranean Sea.

During her second major deployment from 1 December 1989 to 17 February 1990 to the Mediterranean, she suffered a reactor accident. Afterwards, she was placed in reserve. Repairs were never carried out, due to lack of funds and the changing political situation in the Soviet Union. She may have been cannibalized as a spare-parts cache for the other ships in her class. 

For political reasons, Kirov was renamed Admiral Ushakov after the 18th-century admiral Fyodor Fyodorovich Ushakov in 1992, but subsequent photos suggest that it has since reverted to its original name. An overhaul was started in 1999, but the ship was written off in 2001 and was slated to be dismantled in 2003.

In September 2004, it was revealed that the Severodvinsk-based Design Bureau Onega had been tasked with developing the dismantlement project for the cruiser, currently moored at the Severodvinsk Zvezdochka plant. According to the Zvezdochka plant, dismantlement of the former Admiral Ushakov would cost $40 million. This plan was halted when the Russian Navy planned to bring her back to service.  

In 2010, the Russian Navy again announced new plans for an overhaul of the cruiser. At the time, the plan was to modify and reactivate all of the Kirov battlecruisers by 2020. However, in 2012 it was reported that Admiral Ushakov and Admiral Lazarev would not be overhauled due to being in a state of "beyond repair". In 2015, Zvezdochka shipyard CEO Vladimir Nikitin claimed that it was dangerous to remove the spent nuclear fuel from the vessel's two reactors given the fact the ship had been given minimum maintenance for 34 years.

In April 2019, Russia decided to scrap and recycle the Admiral Ushakov in 2021.

Armament
This ship had an armament of missiles and guns as well as electronics. Its largest radar antenna is mounted on its foremast and called "Top Pair" by NATO. Kirovs main weapons are 20 P-700 Granit (SS-N-19 Shipwreck) missiles mounted on deck, designed to engage large surface targets, and air defense is provided for with 12 S-300F (SA-N-6 Grumble) launchers with 96 missiles, two Osa-M (SA-N-4 Gecko) with 40 missiles and the Kashtan CIWS (CADS-N-1) air-defence missile/gun system.

Other weapons are the automatic 130 mm AK-130 gun system, 30 mm AK-630, 10 torpedo/missile tubes, Udav-1 (SS-N-14 Silex) with 40 anti-submarine missiles and the two RBU-1000 six-tube launchers.

In popular culture
 In the novel The Hunt for Red October, Kirov is deployed to the North Atlantic in pursuit of the title submarine, where it has a close encounter with American aircraft.
 In Tom Clancy's Red Storm Rising, Kirov is sunk by the Norwegian submarine Kobben.

See also
 , a Kirov-class cruiser, lead ship of a Soviet 1930–1940s class of conventional cruisers
 Admiral Ushakov (warship), for other ships named for Fyodor Fyodorovich Ushakov

References

External links

Kirov-class battlecruisers
Ships built in the Soviet Union
1977 ships
Cold War cruisers of the Soviet Union
Nuclear ships of the Soviet Navy
Ships built at the Baltic Shipyard